"Middle Child" (stylized in all caps) is a song by American rapper J. Cole. The song was released on January 23, 2019, through Dreamville Records, Roc Nation and Interscope Records, as the first single from Dreamville's 2019 compilation album, Revenge of the Dreamers III. The song was written by J. Cole, T-Minus, Allan Felder, & Norman Harris, and produced by the former two. It was serviced to rhythmic and urban contemporary radio on February 5, 2019. The track contains a sample from "Wake Up to Me", written by Felder and Harris, as performed by First Choice. On the song, J. Cole explores "his place between the old and new generations of hip hop, making him the 'middle child' of rap."

Background and release
On January 20, 2019, J. Cole cleared his Instagram page, the next day Cole cryptically posted a series of posts with lines from the song. They read: I'm Counting My Bullets, I'm Loading My Clips, I'm Writing Down Names, and I'm Making A List, J Cole later deleted the posts. Then, later that same day, Cole announced on social media that he was releasing "Middle Child" on January 23, 2019, at 9:00 PM EST, and uploaded the cover art which featured the song's title capitalized over a static grey background.

On January 25, 2019, in an interview with Complex, producer T-Minus revealed that they made the song about two months before the highly promoted Dreamville recording sessions, which were held the same month "Middle Child" was released. He also spoke about the process he and Cole took making the song:

Production
"Middle Child" was produced by both J. Cole and Canadian hip-hop producer T-Minus. The song includes an exclusive multi-track sample of the horns section from "Wake Up to Me" by '70s Philadelphia trio First Choice, which was found and cleared through music licensing site Tracklib. This allowed them to isolate horns before adding in the drums. In an episode of Genius' Deconstructed, T-Minus explained he "put some reverb on [the horn sample] to give it that effect of it being a little bit more airy, a little bit bigger". Next was the addition of drums to the song, which T-Minus said was reminiscent of KOD "'cause a lot of it's very like stuttery kind of hats, very short but rhythmic". The drums added a variety of sounds, but J. Cole wanted to add an 808 pattern to the song, with the beat going from high to low. T-Minus noted the 808 for being "really hard" and also incorporated hi-hats to add "more energy to the song when it drops". The last production detail was including T-Minus' signature "trippy vibe", which he previously utilized on song like Kendrick Lamar's "Swimming Pools (Drank)" and Lil Wayne's "She Will"—"at the end of the record, we kind of added this effect to make everything kind of sound dark and kind of trippy".

Commercial performance
With only one day of tracking, the song debuted at number 26 on the US Billboard Hot 100. The following week, the song peaked at number 4, later becoming J. Cole's best performing track and highest-charting song until the release of My Life with 21 Savage & Morray, which peaked at number two. The song also peaked at number 2 on the US Hot R&B/Hip-Hop Songs chart.

Music video
An accompanying music video for the track was uploaded to Cole's official YouTube channel on February 25, 2019. Cole announced the video via Twitter on February 22, 2019. The video was shot in Georgia, and was directed by fellow North Carolina rapper Mez, and features cameos from Dreamville artists Lute, Omen, and Cozz. The video serves as Mez' first directed video.
In an interview with Complex, Mez spoke about the creation of the video, he said: 

Reviewing the music video, Laura Dzubay of The Michigan Daily said, "The visuals used in the "MIDDLE CHILD" video are very evocative: Between the lit-up marching band, the covered dead bodies, the stuffed rappers' heads on the mantle and the woman at the end picking a Saran-wrapped head out of a sale freezer at the grocery store, it's almost hard to land on which theme (if any) might be the most significant. What does seem clear is that J. Cole is asserting his readiness to dominate the music scene no matter which direction it takes next." Writing for The Fader, Jordan Darville described the video as "a fun, symbolic, and provocative set of visuals."

Live performances
J. Cole performed "Middle Child" at the 2019 NBA All-Star Game halftime show on February 17, 2019, in Charlotte, North Carolina.

Remixes
Many remixes have been made, including by rappers Deante' Hitchcock, released on January 28, 2019, Reason, released on March 8, 2019, and Montana of 300, released on March 24, 2019.

Awards and nominations

Charts

Weekly charts

Year-end charts

Certifications

Release history

References

External links

2019 singles
2019 songs
J. Cole songs
Song recordings produced by J. Cole
Songs written by J. Cole
Songs written by T-Minus (record producer)
Songs written by Allan Felder
Songs written by Norman Harris (musician)
Song recordings produced by T-Minus (record producer)